Turceni is a town in Gorj County, Oltenia, Romania. It administers five villages: Gârbovu, Jilțu, Murgești, Strâmba-Jiu and Valea Viei.

Natives
 Al. C. Calotescu-Neicu
 Ionuț Tătaru

References

 

Populated places in Gorj County
Localities in Oltenia
Towns in Romania